Exostema is a genus of flowering plants in the family Rubiaceae. It consists of trees and shrubs, endemic to the neotropics, with most of the species occurring in the West Indies.

Description
Exostema is a genus of neotropical trees and shrubs. The flowers have a slender corolla tube with recurved corolla lobes. The stamens are inserted near the base of the corolla tube and exserted well beyond its mouth. The anthers are long and basifixed.

Systematics
The type species for the genus is Exostema caribaeum. It is a tree of Central America and the Caribbean. Its lumber is of limited use.

Exostema was first named by Christiaan Hendrik Persoon as a subgenus of Cinchona. It was first validly published as a genus by Aimé Bonpland in 1807. The generic name is derived from the Ancient Greek words, exo, meaning "outside", and stema, "stamen".

As circumscribed in 2010, Exostema was probably polyphyletic. Species have since been moved to other genera.

Species
, Plants of the World Online accepted the following species:

Exostema acuminatum Urb.
Exostema bicolor Poepp.
Exostema caribaeum (Jacq.) Schult.
Exostema coriaceum (Poir.) Schult.
Exostema glaberrimum Borhidi & M.Fernández
Exostema lancifolium Borhidi & Acuña
Exostema nitens Urb.
Exostema purpureum Griseb.
Exostema revolutum Borhidi & M.Fernández
Exostema salicifolium Griseb.
Exostema spinosum (Le Vavass.) Krug & Urb.

References

External links
Exostema At World Checklist of Selected Plant Families
Exostema At Index Nominum Genericorum
Exostema At Biodiversity Heritage Library
Exostema At IPNI
Exostema At GRIN taxonomy for plants
Exostema At UniProt

 
Rubiaceae genera
Taxa named by Aimé Bonpland
Taxa named by Alexander von Humboldt
Taxonomy articles created by Polbot